Gottfried Anglberger (26 October 1930 – 8 October 2015) was an Austrian wrestler. He competed in the men's Greco-Roman welterweight at the 1952 Summer Olympics.

References

External links
 

1930 births
2015 deaths
Austrian male sport wrestlers
Olympic wrestlers of Austria
Wrestlers at the 1952 Summer Olympics
Place of birth missing